
Year 420 (CDXX) was a leap year starting on Thursday (link will display the full calendar) of the Julian calendar. At the time, it was known as the Year of the Consulship of Theodosius and Constantius (or, less frequently, year 1173 Ab urbe condita). The denomination 420 for this year has been used since the early medieval period, when the Anno Domini calendar era became the prevalent method in Europe for naming years.

Events 
 By place 

 Europe 
 The legendary Pharamond is said to have led the Franks across the Rhine.

 Persia 
 Yazdegerd I dies after a 21-year reign, and is succeeded by his son Bahram V, who becomes head of the Persian Empire. 
 Abdas, bishop of Susa, is accused of burning down one of the fire temples of Ahura Mazda, and after refusing to rebuild it, he is executed, under orders of Shah Yazdegerd I.

 Asia 
 July 10 – The Jin Dynasty ends in China. Liu Yu (Emperor Wu of Liu Song) becomes the first ruler of the Liu Song Dynasty.  Nanjing is reinstated as the capital of northern China.
 The Southern Dynasties begin in China.
 Guisin becomes king of the Korean kingdom of Baekje.

Births 
 Anthemius, emperor of the Western Roman Empire 
 Ecdicius, Roman general (magister militum) 
 Libius Severus, emperor of the Western Roman Empire
 Majorian, emperor of the Western Roman Empire
 Palladius, caesar and son of Petronius Maximus 
 Valamir, king of the Ostrogoths (he is also thought to have been born in 425 AD)
  Yuan Can, high official of the Liu Song Dynasty (d. 477)

Deaths 
 January 21 – Yazdegerd I, king of the Sassanid Empire
 February 26 – Saint Porphyry, bishop of Gaza (Palestine)
 September 30 – Saint Jerome, priest and translator of the Bible 
 Saint Abdas, bishop of Susa (Iran)
 Li Xin, duke of the Chinese state Western Liang
 Orosius, Christian historian and theologian (approximate date) 
 Pelagius, British monk (approximate date)
 Yao, empress consort and wife of Mingyuan

References